Michael James Woods (born 6 April 1990) is an English professional footballer who plays as a midfielder for South Shields. He started his career at Chelsea, and has since played for Harrogate Town, Hartlepool United, Dover Athletic and York City.

Club career

Chelsea
Born in York, North Yorkshire, Woods turned down a scholarship from Leeds United to sign for Chelsea. Leeds United chairman Ken Bates accused Chelsea of tapping-up the sixteen-year-old as well as two other academy players. Eventually the two clubs later agreed an out-of-court settlement, with Chelsea paying £5 million in compensation for Woods and Tom Taiwo.

After spending time in the reserves, Woods made his first-team debut for Chelsea at Stamford Bridge against Macclesfield Town in the third round of the FA Cup on 6 January 2007, making him the fourth-youngest player to ever play for Chelsea at 16 years and 275 days old. He made two appearances for Chelsea in the FA Cup, making his debut as a substitute for Ashley Cole against Macclesfield Town and in the next round coming on for Frank Lampard against Nottingham Forest, but did not play in the Premier League. Although his progress was interrupted by a series of injuries, he was ever-present in the reserves. Woods was released by Chelsea at the end of the 2010–11 season.

On 1 November 2010, Woods joined Notts County on loan until January. He made his debut in the second round of the FA Cup, in County's 3–1 win over AFC Bournemouth.

Yeovil Town
Woods went on a trial spell with Aberdeen in July 2011. On 23 February 2012, following a short trial period Woods signed for Yeovil Town on non-contract terms, with Gary Johnson stating that he was very impressed with his attitude.

On 29 February 2012, Woods played his first match in Yeovil's Somerset Premier Cup defeat by Clevedon and his performance was impressed by Johnson as Woods looks to win a first-team place. On 24 March 2012, Woods made his debut for Yeovil Town after coming on in the 74th minute for Dominic Blizzard in a 1–0 loss against Hartlepool United on 24 March 2012. After a handful of encouraging substitute appearances, including scoring his first professional goal in a 3–1 win over Rochdale on 7 April 2012, he forced his way into the Yeovil starting XI but was sent off in only his second start against Stevenage.

Despite initially impressing Gary Johnson his contract was not renewed at the end of the season.

Doncaster Rovers
On 5 October 2012, Woods joined Doncaster Rovers of League One on non-contract terms and was given number eleven shirt. Woods made his debut on 17 November 2012 against Portsmouth, winning the game 1–0. After making one appearance, it announced on 27 December 2012 that Woods would not have his contract renewed.

Harrogate Town
Following his release from Doncaster, Woods joined Conference North side Harrogate Town on 2 February 2013 on a free transfer. He scored on his debut in Harrogate Town's 2–1 loss against Brackley Town. Woods had an impressive spell at Harrogate Town, making 35 appearances and scoring nine times.

Hartlepool United

After a spell in non-league football, Woods signed for Hartlepool United on 8 August 2014 following a successful trial. He stated that joining Hartlepool United gave him a second chance in professional football. Woods made his Hartlepool United debut, where he made his first start before being substituted in the second half. He scored his first goal for the club, where he "acrobatically volleyed the ball", as Hartlepool United beat Exeter City 2–1 on 11 October 2014.

In March 2015, it was announced that Woods would miss at least the remainder of the season due to him dislocating his ankle and fracturing the fibula. Pools boss Ronnie Moore told the press "He's been our best player to be fair and I'm gutted for him". He returned back to the Hartlepool side five months later.

Second spell at Harrogate
On 19 November 2018, Woods rejoined Harrogate Town.

Dover Athletic
On 31 May 2019, Woods agreed to sign for Dover Athletic on a two-year deal from 1 July 2019. Woods’ contract was terminated by mutual consent on 7 September 2020.

York City
On 7 September 2020, Woods signed for his hometown club York City after leaving Dover. Woods' contract expired at the end of the 2021–22 season, following York's promotion back to the National League.

South Shields
On 1 June 2022, Woods signed for South Shields. Woods made an immediate impact at Shields, scoring consecutively in his first three games.

International career
Woods has been capped several times for the English national under-17 team. He is an England Under-18 international and played in the 2007 FIFA U-17 World Cup. In the summer of 2009, he was called up for the 2009 FIFA U-20 World Cup in Egypt.

Personal life
He is the nephew of Neil Woods and his grandfather is former footballer Alan Woods.

Career statistics

References

External links

1990 births
Living people
Footballers from York
English footballers
England youth international footballers
Association football midfielders
Chelsea F.C. players
Notts County F.C. players
Yeovil Town F.C. players
Doncaster Rovers F.C. players
Harrogate Town A.F.C. players
Hartlepool United F.C. players
Dover Athletic F.C. players
York City F.C. players
South Shields F.C. (1974) players
English Football League players
National League (English football) players
Northern Premier League players